Aleksei Igorevich Revyakin (born 9 May 1982) is a former Russian professional football player.

Club career
He made his Russian Football National League debut for FC Anzhi Makhachkala on 7 October 2004 in a game against FC Chernomorets Novorossiysk. He played 8 seasons in the FNL for 5 clubs.

References

External links
 
 

1982 births
People from Pryluky
Living people
Russian footballers
Association football defenders
PFC CSKA Moscow players
FC Sheksna Cherepovets players
FC Anzhi Makhachkala players
FC Khimki players
FC Salyut Belgorod players
FC Baltika Kaliningrad players
FC Zhemchuzhina Sochi players
FC Ural Yekaterinburg players
FC Fakel Voronezh players